The Ministry of the Gas Industry (Mingazprom) was a government ministry in the Soviet Union responsible for the Soviet oil industry and related sectors.

It was created in 1957 as the Main Administration for the Gas Industry; renamed State Production Committee for the Gas Industry in 1963. It received its ministerial title in 1965. In 1989 Gazprom was established as a successor to the ministry. After the collapse of the Soviet Union in 1991, assets outside of Russia were transferred to national companies such as Ukrgazprom and Turkmengazprom.

List of ministers
Source:
 Aleksei Kortunov (2.10.1965 - 20.9.1972)
 Sabit Orujov (20.9.1972 - 10.5.1981)
 Vasili Dinkov (10.5.1981 - 13.2.1985)
 Viktor Chernomyrdin (13.2.1985 - 17.7.1989)

References

Gas Industry